Zade is both a surname, derived from Persian, meaning "son of", and a given name. Notable people with the name include:

People with the surname
Ali Nayip Zade, Cretan Muslim
Avetis Sultan-Zade (1889–1938), Persian-born ethnic Armenian communist
Muçi Zade, Albanian poet
Sabir Gusein-Zade (born 1950), Russian mathematician

People with the given name
Zade Dirani (born 1980), Jordanian and American pianist

See also
Beyond Zade, an EP by the British band Chrome Hoof
Zada (suffix)
Zadeh

References